Herbert Berg is a bobsledder who competed for West Germany in the late 1970s. He won a bronze medal in the four-man event at the 1977 FIBT World Championships in St. Moritz.

References
Bobsleigh four-man world championship medalists since 1930

German male bobsledders
Possibly living people
Year of birth missing